Johnny Everard (16 April 1924 – 25 May 2021) was an Irish hurler and Gaelic footballer who played for Tipperary Championship club Moyne-Templetuohy. He was a member of the Tipperary senior teams in both codes for the 1949-50 league-championship season.

Following the death of John Coffey in August 2019, Everard became the oldest living All-Ireland medal winner and the oldest All-Ireland winner in Tipperary.

Everard died on 25 May 2021, aged 97.

Honours

Player
Johnstown
Kilkenny Minor Hurling Championship: 1942

Tipperary
All-Ireland Senior Hurling Championship: 1950
Munster Senior Hurling Championship: 1950
National Hurling League: 1949–50
Munster Junior Football Championship: 1952

Manager
Moyne-Templetuohy
Tipperary Senior Hurling Championship: 1971

References

1924 births
2021 deaths
Moyne-Templetuohy hurlers
Tipperary inter-county hurlers
Tipperary inter-county Gaelic footballers